In enzymology, a pyrimidodiazepine synthase is an enzyme that catalyzes the chemical reaction

a pyrimidodiazepine + glutathione disulfide + H2O  6-pyruvoyltetrahydropterin + 2 glutathione

The 3 substrates of this enzyme are pyrimidodiazepine, glutathione disulfide, and H2O, whereas its two products are 6-pyruvoyltetrahydropterin and glutathione.

This enzyme belongs to the family of oxidoreductases, specifically those acting on the CH-NH group of donors with a disulfide as acceptor.  The systematic name of this enzyme class is pyrimidodiazepine:glutathione-disulfide oxidoreductase (ring-opening, cyclizing). Other names in common use include PDA synthase, pyrimidodiazepine:oxidized-glutathione oxidoreductase (ring-opening,, and cyclizing).  This enzyme participates in glutathione metabolism.

References

 

EC 1.5.4
Enzymes of unknown structure